Postural orthostatic tachycardia syndrome (POTS) is a condition characterized by an abnormally large increase in heart rate upon standing. POTS is a disorder of the autonomic nervous system that can lead the individual to experience a variety of symptoms. Symptoms may include lightheadedness, brain fog, blurred vision, weakness, fatigue, headaches, heart palpitations, exercise intolerance, nausea, diminished concentration, tremulousness (shaking), syncope (fainting), coldness or pain in the extremities, chest pain and shortness of breath. Other conditions associated with POTS include Ehlers–Danlos syndrome, mast cell activation syndrome, irritable bowel syndrome, insomnia, chronic headaches, chronic fatigue syndrome, and fibromyalgia. POTS symptoms may be treated with lifestyle changes such as increasing fluid and salt intake, wearing compression stockings, gentler and slow postural changes, avoiding prolonged bedrest, medication and physical therapy. 

The causes of POTS are varied. POTS may develop after a viral infection, surgery, trauma or pregnancy. It has been shown to emerge in previously healthy patients after COVID-19, or in rare cases after COVID-19 vaccination. Risk factors include a family history of the condition. A POTS diagnosis in adults is characterized by an increased heart rate of 30 beats per minute within ten minutes of standing up, while accompanied by symptoms. This increased heart rate should occur in the absence of orthostatic hypotension (>20 mm Hg drop in systolic blood pressure) to be considered POTS. A spinal fluid leak (called spontaneous intracranial hypotension) may have the same signs and symptoms as POTS and should be excluded. Prolonged bedrest may lead to multiple symptoms, including blood volume loss and postural tachycardia. Other conditions which can cause similar symptoms, such as dehydration, orthostatic hypotension, heart problems, adrenal insufficiency, epilepsy, and Parkinson's disease, must not be present.

Treatment may include avoiding factors that bring on symptoms, increasing dietary salt and water, small and frequent meals, avoidance of immobilization, wearing compression stockings, and taking medications. Medications used may include beta blockers, pyridostigmine, midodrine or fludrocortisone. More than 50% of patients whose condition was triggered by a viral infection get better within five years. About 80% of patients have symptomatic improvement with treatment, while 25 percent of patients are so disabled they are unable to work. Retrospective studies has shown that five years after diagnosis, 19% of patients had a full resolution of symptoms.

It is estimated that 500,000 people in the United States have POTS. The average age for POTS onset is 20 years old, and it occurs about five times more frequently in females than in males.

Signs and symptoms

In adults, the primary manifestation is an increase in heart rate of more than 30 beats per minute within ten minutes of standing up. The resulting heart rate is typically more than 120 beats per minute. For people between ages 12 and 19, the minimum increase for a POTS diagnosis is 40 beats per minute. POTS is often accompanied by common features of orthostatic intolerance—in which symptoms that develop while upright are relieved by reclining. These orthostatic symptoms include palpitations, light-headedness, chest discomfort, shortness of breath, nausea, weakness or "heaviness" in the lower legs, blurred vision, and cognitive difficulties. Symptoms may be exacerbated with prolonged sitting, prolonged standing, alcohol, heat, exercise, or eating a large meal.

Up to one-third of POTS patients experience fainting for many reasons, including but not limited to standing, physical exertion, or heat exposure. POTS patients may also experience orthostatic headaches. Some POTS patients may develop blood pooling in the extremities, characterized by a reddish-purple color of the legs and/or hands upon standing. 48% of people with POTS report chronic fatigue and 32% report sleep disturbances. Other POTS patients only exhibit the cardinal symptom of orthostatic tachycardia. Additional signs and symptoms are varied, and may include excessive sweating, lack of sweating, heat intolerance, digestive issues such as nausea, indigestion, constipation, and diarrhea, post-exertional malaise, coat-hanger pain, brain fog, and syncope or presyncope.

Brain fog 
One of the most disabling and prevalent symptoms in POTS is "brain fog", a term used by patients to describe the cognitive difficulties they experience. In one survey of 138 POTS patients, brain fog was defined as "forgetful" (91%), "difficulty thinking" (89%), and "difficulty focusing" (88%). Other common description was "Difficulty processing what others say" (80%), Confusion (71%), Lost (64%), and "Thoughts moving too quickly" (40%). The same survey described the most common triggers of brain fog to be fatigue (91%), lack of sleep (90%), prolonged standing (87%) and dehydration (86%).

Neuropsychological testing has shown that a POTS patient has reduced attention (Ruff 2&7 speed and WAIS-III digits forward), short-term memory (WAIS-III digits back), cognitive processing speed (Symbol digits modalities test) and executive function (Stroop word color and trails B).

A potential cause for brain fog is a decrease in cerebral blood flow (CBF), especially in upright position.

There may be a loss of neurovascular coupling and reduced functional hyperemia in response to cognitive challenge under orthostatic stress – perhaps related to a loss of autoregulatory buffering of beat-by-beat fluctuations in arterial blood flow.

Causes
The symptoms of POTS can be caused by several distinct pathophysiological mechanisms. These mechanisms are poorly understood, and can overlap, with many patients showing features of multiple POTS types. Many people with POTS exhibit low blood volume (hypovolemia), which can decrease the rate of blood flow to the heart. To compensate for low blood volume, the heart increases its cardiac output by beating faster, leading to the symptoms of presyncope and reflex tachycardia.

In the 30% to 60% of cases classified as hyperadrenergic POTS, norepinephrine levels are elevated on standing, often due to hypovolemia or partial autonomic neuropathy. A smaller minority of people with POTS have (typically very high) standing norepinephrine levels that are elevated even in the absence of hypovolemia and autonomic neuropathy; this is classified as central hyperadrenergic POTS. The high norepinephrine levels contribute to symptoms of tachycardia. Another subtype, neuropathic POTS, is associated with denervation of sympathetic nerves in the lower limbs. In this subtype, it is thought that impaired constriction of the blood vessels causes blood to pool in the veins of the lower limbs. Heart rate increases to compensate for this blood pooling.

In up to 50% of cases, there was an onset of symptoms following a viral illness. It may also be linked to vaccination, physical trauma, concussion, pregnancy, or surgery. It is believed that these events could act as a trigger for an autoimmune response that result in POTS.
Covid has been implicated as has more rarely, the vaccine for COVID. It has been shown to emerge in previously healthy patients after COVID-19, or in rare cases after COVID-19 vaccination.

POTS is more common in females than males. It has also been shown to be linked in patients with acute stressors such as pregnancy, recent surgery, or recent trauma. POTS also has been linked to patients with a history of autoimmune diseases, Long Covid, irritable bowel syndrome, anemia, hyperthyroidism, fibromyalgia, diabetes, amyloidosis, sarcoidosis, systemic lupus erythematosus, and cancer. Genetics likely plays a role, with one study finding that one in eight POTS patients reported a history of orthostatic intolerance in their family.

Autoimmunity 
There is an increasing number of studies indicating that POTS is an autoimmune disease. A high number of patients has elevated levels of autoantibodies against the adrenergic alpha 1 receptor and against the muscarinic acetylcholine M4 receptor.

Elevations of autoantibodies targeting adrenergic α1 receptor has been associated with symptoms severity in patients with POTS.

More recently, autoantibodies against other targets have been identified in small cohorts of POTS patients. Signs of innate immune system activation with elaboration of pro-inflammatory cytokines has also been reported in a cohort of POTS patients.

Secondary POTS 
If POTS is caused by another condition, it may be classified as secondary POTS. Chronic diabetes mellitus is one common cause. POTS can also be secondary to gastrointestinal disorders that are associated with low fluid intake due to nausea or fluid loss through diarrhea, leading to hypovolemia. Systemic lupus erythematosus and other autoimmune diseases have also been linked to POTS.

There is a subset of patients who present with both POTS and mast cell activation syndrome (MCAS), and it is not yet clear whether MCAS is a secondary cause of POTS or simply comorbid, however, treating MCAS for these patients can significantly improve POTS symptoms.

POTS can also co-occur in all types of Ehlers–Danlos syndrome (EDS), a hereditary connective tissue disorder marked by loose hypermobile joints prone to subluxations and dislocations, skin that exhibits moderate or greater laxity, easy bruising, and many other symptoms. A trifecta of POTS, EDS, and Mast Cell Activation Syndrome (MCAS) is becoming increasingly more common, with a genetic marker common among all three conditions. POTS is also often accompanied by vasovagal syncope, with a 25% overlap being reported. There are some overlaps between POTS and chronic fatigue syndrome, with evidence of POTS in 10–20% of CFS cases. Fatigue and reduced exercise tolerance are prominent symptoms of both conditions, and dysautonomia may underlie both conditions.

POTS can sometimes be a paraneoplastic syndrome associated with cancer.

There are case reports of people developing POTS and other forms of dysautonomia post-COVID. There is no good large-scale empirical evidence yet to prove a connection, so for now the evidence is preliminary.

Diagnosis

POTS is most commonly diagnosed by a cardiologist (41%), cardiac electrophysiologist (15%), or neurologist (19%). The average number of physicians seen before receiving diagnosis is seven, and the average delay before diagnosis is 4.7 years.

Diagnostic criteria 
A POTS diagnosis requires the following characteristics:
 For patients age 20 or older, increase in heart rate ≥30 bpm within ten minutes of upright posture (tilt table test or standing) from a supine position
 For patients age 12–19, heart rate increase must be >40 bpm
 Associated with related symptoms that are worse with upright posture and that improve with recumbence
 Chronic symptoms that have lasted for longer than six months
 In the absence of other disorders, medications, or functional states that are known to predispose to orthostatic tachycardia

Orthostatic intolerance
An increase in heart rate upon moving to an upright posture is known as orthostatic (upright) tachycardia (fast heart rate). It occurs without any coinciding drop in blood pressure, as that would indicate orthostatic hypotension. Certain medications to treat POTS may cause orthostatic hypotension. It is accompanied by other features of orthostatic intolerance—symptoms that develop in an upright position and are relieved by reclining. These orthostatic symptoms include palpitations, light-headedness, chest discomfort, shortness of breath, nausea, weakness or "heaviness" in the lower legs, blurred vision, and cognitive difficulties.

Differential diagnoses 
A variety of autonomic tests are employed to exclude autonomic disorders that could underlie symptoms, while endocrine testing is used to exclude hyperthyroidism and rarer endocrine conditions. Electrocardiography is normally performed on all patients to exclude other possible causes of tachycardia. In cases where a particular associated condition or complicating factor are suspected, other non-autonomic tests may be used: echocardiography to exclude mitral valve prolapse, and thermal threshold tests for small-fiber neuropathy.

Testing the cardiovascular response to prolonged head-up tilting, exercise, eating, and heat stress may help determine the best strategy for managing symptoms. POTS has also been divided into several types (see § Causes), which may benefit from distinct treatments. People with neuropathic POTS show a loss of sweating in the feet during sweat tests, as well as impaired norepinephrine release in the leg, but not arm. This is believed to reflect peripheral sympathetic denervation in the lower limbs. People with hyperadrenergic POTS show a marked increase of blood pressure and norepinephrine levels when standing, and are more likely to have from prominent palpitations, anxiety, and tachycardia.

People with POTS can be misdiagnosed with inappropriate sinus tachycardia (IST) as they present similarly. One distinguishing feature is those with POTS rarely exhibit >100 bpm while in a supine position, while patients with IST often have a resting heart rate >100 bpm. Additionally patients with POTS display a more pronounced change in heart rate in response to postural change.

Treatment
POTS treatment involves using multiple methods in combination to counteract cardiovascular dysfunction, address symptoms, and simultaneously address any associated disorders. For most patients, water intake should be increased, especially after waking, in order to expand blood volume (reducing hypovolemia). Eight to ten cups of water daily are recommended. Increasing salt intake, by adding salt to food, taking salt tablets, or drinking sports drinks and other electrolyte solutions is an effective way to raise blood pressure by helping the body retain water. Different physicians recommend different amounts of sodium to their patients. Combining these techniques with gradual physical training enhances their effect. In some cases, when increasing oral fluids and salt intake is not enough, intravenous saline or the drug desmopressin is used to help increase fluid retention.

Large meals worsen symptoms for some people. These people may benefit from eating small meals frequently throughout the day instead. Alcohol and food high in carbohydrates can also exacerbate symptoms of orthostatic hypotension. Excessive consumption of caffeine beverages should be avoided, because they can promote urine production (leading to fluid loss) and consequently hypovolemia. Exposure to extreme heat may also aggravate symptoms.

Prolonged physical inactivity can worsen the symptoms of POTS. Techniques that increase a person's capacity for exercise, such as endurance training or graded exercise therapy, can relieve symptoms for some patients. Aerobic exercise performed for 20 minutes a day, three times a week, is sometimes recommended for patients who can tolerate it. Exercise may have the immediate effect of worsening tachycardia, especially after a meal or on a hot day. In these cases, it may be easier to exercise in a semi-reclined position, such as riding a recumbent bicycle, rowing, or swimming.

When changing to an upright posture, finishing a meal, or concluding exercise, a sustained hand grip can briefly raise the blood pressure, possibly reducing symptoms. Compression garments can also be of benefit by constricting blood pressures with external body pressure.

Aggravating factors include exertion (81%), continued standing (80%), heat (79%), and after meals (42%).

Medication
If nonpharmacological methods are ineffective, medication may be necessary. Medications used may include beta blockers, pyridostigmine, midodrine, or fludrocortisone. As of 2013, no medication has been approved by the U.S. Food and Drug Administration to treat POTS, but a variety are used off-label. Their efficacy has not yet been examined in long-term randomized controlled trials.

Fludrocortisone may be used to enhance sodium retention and blood volume, which may be beneficial not only by augmenting sympathetically mediated vasoconstriction, but also because a large subset of POTS patients appear to have low absolute blood volume.

While people with POTS typically have normal or even elevated arterial blood pressure, the neuropathic form of POTS is presumed to constitute a selective sympathetic venous denervation. In these patients the selective Alpha-1 adrenergic receptor agonist midodrine may increase venous return, enhance stroke volume, and improve symptoms. Midodrine should only be taken during the daylight hours as it may promote supine hypertension.

Sinus node blocker Ivabradine can successfully restrain heart rate in POTS without affecting blood pressure, demonstrated in approximately 60% of people with POTS treated in an open-label trial of ivabradine experienced symptom improvement.

Pyridostigmine has been reported to restrain heart rate and improve chronic symptoms in approximately half of people.

The selective alpha-1 agonist phenylephrine has been used successfully to enhance venous return and stroke volume in some people with POTS. However, this medication may be hampered by poor oral bioavailability.

Prognosis
POTS has a favorable prognosis when managed appropriately. Symptoms improve within five years of diagnosis for many patients, and 60% return to their original level of functioning. Approximately 90% of people with POTS respond to a combination of pharmacological and physical treatments. Those who develop POTS in their early to mid teens will likely respond well to a combination of physical methods as well as pharmacotherapy. Outcomes are more guarded for adults newly diagnosed with POTS. Some people do not recover, and a few even worsen with time. The hyperadrenergic type of POTS typically requires continuous therapy. If POTS is caused by another condition, outcomes depend on the prognosis of the underlying disorder.

Epidemiology
The prevalence of POTS is unknown. One study estimated a minimal rate of 170 POTS cases per 100,000 individuals, but the true prevalence is likely higher due to underdiagnosis. Another study estimated that there are at least 500,000 cases in the United States. POTS is more common in women than men, with a female-to-male ratio of 4:1. Most people with POTS are aged between 20 and 40, with an average onset of 21. Diagnoses of POTS beyond age 40 are rare, perhaps because symptoms improve with age.

As recently stated, up to one-third of POTS patients also present with Vasovagal Syncope (VVS).  This ratio is probably higher if pre-Syncope patients, patients that report the symptoms of Syncope without overt fainting, were included.  Given the difficulty with current autonomic measurements in quantitatively isolating and differentiating Parasympathetic (Vagal) activity from Sympathetic activity without assumption or approximation, the current direction of research and clinical assessment is understandable:  perpetuating uncertainty regarding underlying cause, prescribing beta-blockers and proper daily hydration as the only therapy, not addressing the orthostatic dysfunction as the underlying cause, and recommending acceptance and associated lifestyle changes to cope.  This is unfortunate.

Direct measures of Parasympathetic (Vagal) activity obviates the uncertainty and lack of true relief of POTS as well as VVS.  For example, the hypothesis that POTS is an auto-immune disorder may be an indication that a significant number of POTS cases are indeed co-morbid with VVS.  Remember the Parasympathetic Nervous System is the memory for, and controls and coordinates, the immune system.  If Parasympathetic (Vagal) over-, or prolonged-, activation is chronic then portions of the immune system may remain active beyond the limits of the infection.  Given that portions of the immune system are not of self, these portions remain active and continue to “feed.”  Once the only source of “feed” is self, the immune system begins to attack the host.  This is the definition of autoimmune.  This is a counter-hypothesis that may provide a simpler explanation with a more immediate plan for therapy and relief.  For it may be that relieving the Vagal over-activation, will retires the self-attacking portion of the immune system, thereby relieving the autoimmunity. 

Another example may be “Hyperadrenergic POTS.”  A counter hypothesis and perhaps a simpler explanation that leads to more direct therapy and improved outcomes is again the fact that POTS and VVS may be co-morbid.  It is well known that Parasympathetic (Vagal) over-activation may cause secondary Sympathetic over-activation.  Without direct Parasympathetic (Vagal) measures, the resulting assumption is that the secondary Sympathetic over-activation (the definition of “hyperadrenergic”) is actually the primary autonomic dysfunction.  Simply treating the (secondary) Sympathetic over-activation may be just treating a symptom in these cases, which may work for a while but then the body compensates and more medication is needed or the patient become unresponsive and the permanent degraded lifestyles are considered the only option.  Again, this is unfortunate.  Given that cases of POTS with VVS involves different portions of the nervous system (Parasympathetic and Sympathetic), and that both branches may be treated simultaneously, albeit differently, true relief of both conditions, as needed, is quite possible, and the cases of these newer hypothesized causes may be relieved with current, less expensive, and shorter-term therapy modalities.

Co-morbidities
Conditions that are commonly reported with POTS include:
 Migraine headaches (11–40%)
 Ehlers–Danlos syndrome (20–25%)
 Fibromyalgia (11–20%)
 Irritable bowel syndrome (7–30%)
 Chronic fatigue syndrome (7–21%)
 Mast cell activation disorder (6–9%)

History
In 1871, physician Jacob Mendes Da Costa described a condition that resembled the modern concept of POTS. He named it irritable heart syndrome. Cardiologist Thomas Lewis expanded on the description, coining the term soldier's heart because it was often found among military personnel. The condition came to be known as Da Costa's syndrome, which is now recognized as several distinct disorders, including POTS.

Postural tachycardia syndrome was coined in 1982 in a description of a patient who had postural tachycardia, but not orthostatic hypotension. Ronald Schondorf and Phillip A. Low of the Mayo Clinic first used the name postural orthostatic tachycardia syndrome, POTS, in 1993.

Notable cases
British politician Nicola Blackwood revealed in March 2015 that she had been diagnosed with Ehlers–Danlos syndrome in 2013 and that she had later been diagnosed with POTS. She was appointed Parliamentary Under-Secretary of State for Life Science by Prime Minister Theresa May in 2019 and given a life peerage that enabled her to take a seat in Parliament. As a junior minister, it is her responsibility to answer questions in parliament on the subjects of Health and departmental business. When answering these questions, it is customary for ministers to sit when listening to the question and then to rise to give an answer from the despatch box, thus standing up and sitting down numerous times in quick succession throughout a series of questions. On 17 June 2019, she fainted during one of these questioning sessions after standing up from a sitting position four times in the space of twelve minutes, and it was suggested that her POTS was a factor in her fainting. Asked about the incident, she stated: "I was frustrated and embarrassed my body gave up on me at work ... But I am grateful it gives me a chance to shine a light on a condition many others are also living with."

References

Further reading 

 
 
 

Vascular diseases
Peripheral nervous system disorders
Endocrine diseases
Syndromes
Wikipedia medicine articles ready to translate
Wikipedia neurology articles ready to translate